Marat Abdulkhaevich Nuriev (born May 14, 1966 in Shemyakovo, Apastovsky District) is a Russian political figure and a deputy of the 8th State Duma. 

Nuriyev joined the United Russia in 2002. From 2005 to 2012, he was the deputy of the Kazan City Duma of the 1st, 2nd, and 3rd convocations. In 2019-2021, Nuriev was the deputy of the State Council of the Republic of Tatarstan. He left the post in September 2021, as he was elected deputy of the 8th State Duma.

Sanctions
In December 2022 the EU sanctioned Marat Nuriyev in relation to the 2022 Russian invasion of Ukraine.

References

1957 births
Living people
United Russia politicians
21st-century Russian politicians
Eighth convocation members of the State Duma (Russian Federation)